Army Radio ( lit. IDF waves) or Galei Tzahal, known in Israel by its acronym Galatz, is a nationwide Israeli radio network operated by the Israel Defense Forces. The station broadcasts news, music, traffic reports and educational programs to the general public as well as entertainment and military news magazines for soldiers. The network has one main station and an offshoot - Galgalatz (Hebrew: גלגל"צ) - that broadcasts (mainly English-language and Hebrew) music and traffic reports 24 hours a day in Hebrew. The staff includes both soldiers and civilians. As of December 2013, the station is no longer broadcast via shortwave to Europe. There is still a livestream feed on the internet.

History
Galatz started its transmissions on September 24, 1950, as a continuance of the Hagana transmission to the Jewish public during the 1948 Arab-Israeli War. Transmissions began with a trumpet blast at 6:30 p.m. followed by HaTikva, the Israeli national anthem. An improvised studio had been set up inside a former school building in Ramat Gan, with army blankets hung on the walls to muffle background noise.

In 1956, its status was defined by the Israeli Broadcasting Authority law (paragraph 48). The Israel Defense Forces was authorized to choose its programming for soldiers, but programs for civilians had to receive approval from the IBA. During the station's formative period in the 1960s and 1970s, it was headed by Yitzhak Livni. In 1973, during the Yom Kippur War, Galatz was the first Israeli radio station to broadcast around the clock. In 1982, during the Lebanon War, the station collaborated with Israeli Educational Television (IETV). This wartime cooperation led to a daily news and interview show called Erev Hadash (lit. New Evening).

Galatz was the first radio station in Israel to abandon the formal, somewhat stilted Hebrew that was normally used in the media. Its entertainment programs to soldiers were the first to use colloquial Hebrew on air. Its news bulletins use a more relaxed linguistic style than IBA's Kol Yisrael (קול ישראל, Voice of Israel) hourly bulletins. This presentation style proved particularly popular among two age groups: youngsters and senior citizens. In April 1983, the radio station broadcast an interview with historian Yehuda Bauer discussing similarities between the Holocaust and the Armenian genocide. Despite protests by the Israeli Ministry of Foreign Affairs, Ron Ben-Yishai refused to cancel the program, leading to a diplomatic incident in Israel–Turkey relations due to Turkey's Armenian genocide denial.

For many years Galei Zahal broadcasts were mainly geared toward soldiers, including music programs conveying soldiers’ greetings and various broadcasts related to the IDF. The station was unique in that it incorporated soldiers serving in the regular army into journalistic positions, including reporters, editors, producers, news broadcasters, music broadcasters, musical editors, announcers, etc. Following the Yom Kippur War in 1973, the station began broadcasting 24 hours a day, expanding its broadcasts to include news broadcasts and current affairs programming. For years, it was the only Israeli station that continued to broadcast throughout the night. In November 1993 Galei Zahal began operating Galgalatz, which broadcasts music interspersed with traffic reports and has high listener rates.

Cultural role
According to Oren Soffer, a head of communication studies in Open University,  Galei Zahal has become symbol of pluralism and journalistic freedom.

According to Michael Handelzalts, a long-time Haaretz columnist and theater critic, Galei Zahal had a "far-reaching positive influence on Israeli culture," and "address[ed] issues of culture in the widest sense." Beginning in the 1960s, new poems were read aloud once a week. In the 1970s, the station broadcast radio plays inaugurated "University on the Air," and held the first live telephone conversations with listeners ever broadcast on a radio station in Israel. Ram Evron hosted live nightly talk shows.
Recently, Galei Tzahal was the first radio station to incorporate a podcast into their scheduling when they gave "Israel Story" a permanent slot.

Administration
The station is managed by a civilian appointed by the defense minister for a 3- to 5-year term. The station commander holds the military rank of Sgan Aluf, although the job is mainly managerial and editorial. The current station commander is Shimon Elkabetz. Galei Tzahal was considered a division of the Education and Youth Corps until October 2017.

Notable broadcasters
 Erez Tal
 Razi Barkai
 Ilana Dayan
 Irit Linur
 Yoav Kutner

Criticism over political campaigning during the 2021 Israeli election 
In March 17, 2021 New Hope party led by Gideon Sa'ar sent an official letter via attorney claiming that Yaakov Bardugo's was conducting illegal pre-election campaigning on behalf of the Likud party. Under Israeli law any form of campaigning during the 60 day preceding an election is strictly regulated.

The party called out Bardugo's repeated pro Likud messaging as well as an incident in which he called party members 'deserters and extortionists'. The party who at the time was expected to take around 10 seats in the upcoming election demanded his immediate suspension. On March 18 the Association of Journalists in Israel (numbering 3500 members of the Israeli news media) published an urgent message to the station's commander, Simeon Elkabetz, demanding action be taken to stop the conduct of the host. This came after the latter lashed out against Moria Assaraf, the station's political correspondent, asking her "disgracefully" if she was "Ashkenazi's spokesperson" during a live show.

Criticism over Political Imbalance 
Criticism over political imbalance exists over the station from both left & right wing sides of the political map.

The My Israel movement launched on June 21, 2011 a campaign against the station claiming that it was operating against IDF soldiers and out of extreme left wing political agenda. On June 26 more than 100 reserve soldiers demonstrated against the station calling to privatize it or balancing its broadcast tone.

In September 2020, the Times of Israel newspaper published an investigative article under the title "Bardugo Airwaves" describing the use made by broadcaster Yaakov Bardugo of his daily political program for the purpose of promoting right wing political agenda and the spread of fake news. In February 2021, the newspaper published a second investigation titled "One Man's Propaganda Machine" over Bardugo's use of the station as a platform for repeated assault against the Attorney General Avichai Mandelblit. In March 2021, the newspaper TheMarker published its own investigative article under the title "The Home of (Netanyahu's) Soldiers" (a play on the station's slogan "The home of the soldiers" in Hebrew) which included a testimony by a former soldier in the station describing a scripting channel between prime minister Benjamin Netanyahu's staff and the broadcaster, among other via his staff head Natan Eshel.

See also
 Culture of Israel
 Israeli journalism

References

External links 
 Army Radio website
 Live online stream 

Radio stations in Israel
Radio stations established in 1950
1950 establishments in Israel
Military broadcasting